The HomePNA Alliance is an incorporated non-profit industry association of companies that develops and standardizes technology for home networking over the existing coaxial cables and telephone wiring within homes, so new wires do not need to be installed.

HomePNA was developed for entertainment applications such as IPTV which require good quality of service (QoS). HomePNA 3.1 uses frequencies above those used for digital subscriber line and analog voice calls over phone wires and below those used for broadcast and direct broadcast satellite TV over coax, so it can coexist with those services on the same wires.

HomePNA does not manufacture products, although its members do. HomePNA creates industry specifications which it then standardizes under the International Telecommunication Union (ITU) standards body. The HomePNA Alliance, tests implementations, and certifies products if they pass.

HomePNA promoter companies are AT&T Inc., Technicolor SA, Pace plc, Sigma Designs, Motorola, Cisco Systems, Sunrise Telecom and K-Micro. 

Devices that use HPNA technology as part of whole-home multi-media content products include Advanced Digital Broadcast, Inneoquest and NetSys.

Alternatives to HomePNA include: Power line communication, Wi-Fi, data over cable, and multimedia over coax.

History 
It was formerly the Home Phoneline Networking Alliance, also known as HPNA.

HomePNA 1.0 technology was developed by Tut Systems in the 1990s.

HomePNA 2.0 was developed by Epigram and was approved by the ITU as Recommendations G.9951, G.9952 and G.9953.

HomePNA 3.0 was developed by Broadcom (which had purchased Epigram) and Coppergate Communications and was approved by the ITU as Recommendation G.9954  in February 2005.

HomePNA 3.1 was developed by Coppergate Communications and was approved by the ITU as Recommendation G.9954  in January 2007. The original protocols used balanced pair telephone wire. HomePNA 3.1 added Ethernet over coax.

In March 2009, HomePNA announced  a liaison agreement with the HomeGrid Forum to promote the ITU-T G.hn wired home networking standard. In May 2013 the HomePNA alliance merged with the HomeGrid Forum.

Technical characteristics
HomePNA uses frequency-division multiplexing (FDM), which uses different frequencies for voice and data on the same wires without interfering with each other. A standard phone line has enough room to support voice, high-speed DSL and a landline phone.

Two custom chips designed using the HPNA specifications were developed by Broadcom: the 4100 chip can send and receive signals over 1,000 ft (305 m) on a typical phone line. The larger 4210 controller chip strips away noise and passes data on. 

A HomePNA setup would include a HomePNA card or external adapter for each computer, an external adapter, cables, and software. A low-pass filter may be needed between any phones and their respective jacks to block noise. HomePNA adapters come in PCI, USB, and PC Card formats.

See also
 Ethernet over coax
 Home gateway
 HomePlug Powerline Alliance
 Home network
 Router (computing)
 Wireless LAN
 IEEE 802.3
 IEEE 802.11
 IEEE 1905

References

External links 

 ITU-T Recommendation G.9951 : Phoneline networking transceivers - Foundation (HomePNA 2.0)
 ITU-T Recommendation G.9952 : Phoneline networking transceivers - Payload format and link layer requirements (HomePNA 2.0)
 ITU-T Recommendation G.9953 : Phoneline networking transceivers - Isolation function (HomePNA 2.0)
 ITU-T Recommendation G.9954 : Phoneline networking transceivers - Enhanced physical, media access, and link layer specifications (HomePNA 3.0 and 3.1)
 ITU-T Recommendations: Series G

Computer network organizations
Local loop